Sangoro-ike  is an earthfill dam located in Kagawa Prefecture in Japan. The dam is used for irrigation and water supply. The catchment area of the dam is 0.9 km2. The dam impounds about 1  ha of land when full and can store 85 thousand cubic meters of water. The construction of the dam was started on 1916 and completed in 1924.

See also
List of dams in Japan

References

Dams in Kagawa Prefecture